Anerley is a district of South East London, England.

Anerley may also refer to:

 Anerley, Saskatchewan, a small hamlet in Canada
 Anerley, South Africa, a town in South Africa

See also
 Annerley, Queensland, Australia, a suburb of Brisbane